MKU is a three-letter initialism which may refer to:

 Mustafa Kemal University, in Hatay Province, Turkey
 Island Air (Hawaii)'s ICAO airline code.
 Madurai Kamaraj University in India.
 Mt Kenya University
 MKU (company) an Indian manufacturing company

 MK:U, a planned undergraduate campus of Cranfield University to be built in Milton Keynes, England